Anders "Anden" ("The Duck") Matthesen (born 6 July 1975) is a Danish stand-up comedian, actor, and rapper. He is known for creating a wide array of memorable characters and stereotypes, which he uses as alter egos in performances.

After failing as a rapper, Matthesen started his stand-up career at the Danish Stand-Up Championship in 1993, where he finished in second place. After making a name on this scene, as well as through his comedy radio stories, he also contributed to several other projects. For example, a television "Julekalender", Jul på Vesterbro, featured fourteen characters of his invention, all of them played by himself. These included the drunken, prostitute-addicted sailor Stewart Stardust and his junkie son, Danny. The story revolves around Stewart's hot dog stand, which a band of terrorists attempts to use to detonate a nuclear device during a UN meeting in Copenhagen.

Anders Matthesen has also released several CDs with his radio material, in addition to the animated movie Terkel in Trouble, based on one of these. He has also acted in a few plays, including one about the life of Danish travel tycoon Simon Spies. In 2006, he revisited rapping on his album Soevnloes, to great success, earning a Gold record.

Recently, Anders Matthesen has gone back to his stand-up roots, touring Denmark with shows like Bytte, bytte købmand (in collaboration with stand-up comedian Thomas Hartmann) from 2009 and the one-man show ANDERS, which was released on DVD on 11 November 2013.

Discography
Comedy and music albums
 Børneradio (2000)
 Hva' snakker du om? – Den ka' byttes Vol. 1 (2000)
 Hva snakker du om? 'Godnat lille dengse' Sang af Hva' snakker du om? (2000)
 Hva' snakker du om? - Arne fortæller... Terkel i knibe (2001)
 Soevnloes (2006)
 Villa Peakstate (2010)
 Blodhævn (2018)
 Børnetelefonen (2018)
 Anden bringer ud (2019)

Soundtracks
 Jul på Vesterbro (2003)
 Terkel i knibe (2004)
 Sorte kugler (2009)
 Ternet Ninja (2018)
 Ternet Ninja 2 (2021)

Selected filmography

Stand-up
 Hva' snakker du om? (2001)
 Talegaver til børn 2001 (co-host with Mick Øgendahl) (2001)
 Talegaver til børn 2002 (2002)
 9 års jubilæum (2002)
 Den ægte vare (2002)
 Tal for dig selv (2004)
 Anden paa coke? (2006)
 Anders Matthesen ...vender tilbage (2008)
 Bytte, bytte købmand (2009)
 ANDERS (2013) (2016)
 Shh (2016)
 Anden 25 (2018)
 anden bringer ud (2019)

Musicals
 Simon - Spies, skæg og ballade (2004)

Film
 Terkel i knibe (2004)
 Rene hjerter (2006)
 Sorte kugler (2009)
 Ternet Ninja (2018)
 De frivilige (2019)
 Ternet Ninja 2 (2021)

Television
 Andarki (1998)
 Andensortering (1998)
 Casper og Mandrilaftalen (1999)
 Langt fra Las Vegas (2001)
 Perforama (2002)
 Jul på Vesterbro (2004)
 Comedy Kuren (2008)

External links
 
 Danish fansite
 

Living people
1975 births
Danish stand-up comedians
Danish male voice actors
Danish male musical theatre actors
Danish male film actors
Danish male television actors